Trickjumps are a form of movement, usually in video games, that is used to enhance the mobility of the player when jumping, often in a way which demonstrates skill or expertise, or is visually impressive. These methods are sometimes unforeseen by the creator of the game.

References

Esports techniques
Video game terminology